Baïda (English : Blonde) is the first album by French singer Faudel, released in 1997.

Success

The album spent 42 weeks in the SNEP charts, selling over 350,000 copies. It was nominated for Best Traditional Album at the victoires de la musique 1998.

Track listing
"Anti" (4:25)
"Eray" (3:35)
"Tellement N'Brick" (3:59)
"Dis-Moi" (3:51)
"Omri" (4:40)
"La Valse" (5:02)
"Baïda" (4:05)
"Miskin" (3:34)
"Abadou" (4:24)
"N'Sel Fik" (5:38)
"Ma Vie" (5:16)
"Tellement N'Brick" (Hip Hop Remix) (4:03)
"Baïda" (Orientale Version) (5:04)

Charts

Certifications

References

1997 albums
French-language albums